German submarine U-288 was a Type VIIC U-boat of Nazi Germany's Kriegsmarine during World War II.

The submarine was laid down on 7 September 1942 at the Bremer Vulkan yard at Bremen-Vegesack as yard number 53. She was launched on 15 May 1943 and commissioned on 26 June under the command of Oberleutnant zur See Willy Meyer.

She did not sink or damage any ships.

She was sunk by British aircraft of the Fleet Air Arm from two escort carriers on 3 April 1944.

Design
German Type VIIC submarines were preceded by the shorter Type VIIB submarines. U-288 had a displacement of  when at the surface and  while submerged. She had two shafts and two  propellers.

U-288 was fitted with five  torpedo tubes (four fitted at the bow and one at the stern), fourteen torpedoes, one  SK C/35 naval gun, 220 rounds, and two twin  C/30 anti-aircraft guns. The boat had a complement of between forty-four and sixty.

Service history
U-288 served with the 8th U-boat Flotilla for training from June 1943 to January 1944 and operationally with the 13th flotilla from 1 February.

First patrol
The boat's initial foray began with her departure from Kiel on 26 February 1944 for the Norwegian Sea and finished at Narvik on 11 March.

Second patrol and loss

She departed Narvik on 23 March 1944. On 3 April she attacked Convoy JW 58 but was sunk by rockets and depth charges from a Fairey Swordfish of 819 Naval Air Squadron and a TBM Avenger and a Martlet, both of 846 squadron.

Forty-nine men died; there were no survivors.

Wolfpacks
U-288 took part in four wolfpacks, namely:
 Boreas (2 – 5 March 1944) 
 Orkan (5 – 10 March 1944) 
 Blitz (24 – 30 March 1944) 
 Hammer (30 March – 3 April 1944)

References

Bibliography

External links

German Type VIIC submarines
U-boats commissioned in 1943
U-boats sunk in 1944
World War II submarines of Germany
World War II shipwrecks in the Arctic Ocean
1943 ships
Ships built in Bremen (state)
U-boats sunk by British aircraft
U-boats sunk by depth charges
Ships lost with all hands
Maritime incidents in April 1944